Amelia Marshall (born April 2, 1958) is an American soap opera actress.

Biography
Her most famous role to date is television presenter Gillian "Gilly" Grant Speakes, which she played on Guiding Light from 1989 until 1996. Marshall's character proved so popular that she rose from an Under-Five to a full contract in less than six months.

As soon as she left Guiding Light, she was offered the role of Belinda Keefer on All My Children, where she stayed until 1999. On October 3, 2000, Marshall made her first appearance on Passions in the role of the villainess Liz Sanbourne, sister of Dr. Eve Russell. Marshall was on contract for four and a half years, until she was sacked from the soap in July 2007 as a result of budget cuts.

Marshall's other TV credits include Cosby, Battle of the Network Stars, Lizzie McGuire, The District, and as a judge at the Miss Universe Pageant. Her stage credits include Harrigan 'n Hart (Broadway), Big Deal (Broadway), Robert Klein (Broadway), Minor Demons (off Broadway), Queenie Pie (Kennedy Center), Antigone (Kennedy Center), Cats (touring), West Side Story (touring), Telltale Hearts (Crossroads Theater) and Sweet Charity. Film credits include: Stuart Little 2, According to Spencer and Cul-de-Sac. She has also appeared in the operas, Treemonisha and Porgy and Bess.

She is the mother of Kent Marshall Dylan Schaffer.

References

External links
Amelia Marshall profile on SoapCentral

1958 births
Living people
American soap opera actresses
People from Albany, Georgia
Actresses from Georgia (U.S. state)
21st-century American women